Bathybelidae is a family of sagittoideans in the order Aphragmophora. It consists of a single genus, Bathybelos Owre, 1973, which consists of a single species, Bathybelos typhlops Owre, 1973.

References

Chaetognatha